Duchess Sophie Caroline Marie of Brunswick-Wolfenbüttel (7 October 1737 – 22 December 1817) was Margravine of Brandenburg-Bayreuth by marriage to Frederick, Margrave of Brandenburg-Bayreuth. She was the eldest daughter of Charles I, Duke of Brunswick-Wolfenbüttel, and his wife, Philippine Charlotte of Prussia, sister of Frederick the Great.

Life

George, Prince of Wales

In 1753, George II of Great Britain hoped to marry Sophie Caroline to his grandson George, Prince of Wales (the future George III). This was an attempt to improve relations with Prussia, as Sophie Caroline was a niece of Frederick II of Prussia and George II needed Prussian troops to help offset the alliance between France and Austria that had occurred as a result of the Diplomatic Revolution. The prince's mother Augusta, Dowager Princess of Wales, thwarted George II's plans, however, which increased tensions within the British royal family. The Prince of Wales himself, influenced by his mother, was vehemently opposed to the match, declaring he would not be "bewolfenbuttelled". Augusta wanted her son to marry her niece Frederica, but this union also fell through. Soon after becoming king in 1760, George III married Charlotte of Mecklenburg-Strelitz instead the following year, in what was to become a happy marriage.

George and his mother's refusal also reflected another changing reality in British foreign policy: the relationship with the Electorate of Hanover. George II and his father George I were both descended from the House of Hanover, and thus held the electorate very dear to their hearts. As a daughter of the Duke of Brunswick-Wolfenbüttel, Sophie Caroline was ancestrally related to neighboring Hanover; good relations between the electorate and its neighbors were vital to its continuing security, particularly when another war was soon expected. The Prince of Wales and his mother however did not possess the same attachment to Hanover, thus influencing their decision to reject a match with Sophie Caroline. Though this match was not to be, Sophie Caroline's brother Charles II, Duke of Brunswick-Wolfenbüttel, married George's sister Princess Augusta in 1764, and George III's son George IV married their daughter Caroline of Brunswick, thus continuing the close ties between the two houses.

Marriage
In Brunswick on 20 September 1759, 11 months after the death of his first wife Princess Wilhelmine of Prussia (Sophie Caroline's aunt), Sophie Caroline married Frederick, Margrave of Brandenburg-Bayreuth. He was 26 years older than she was, and their marriage was childless. Frederick did have a daughter from his first marriage, Margravine Elisabeth Fredericka Sophie of Brandenburg-Bayreuth, who was five years older than Sophie Caroline. Frederick died on 26 February 1763. Without any male issue, he was succeeded on his death by his uncle, Frederick Christian.

Sophie Caroline died on 22 December 1817 at the age of 80. She never remarried.

Ancestry

References

Sources

|-
 

1737 births
1817 deaths
People from Wolfenbüttel
House of Brunswick-Bevern
18th-century German people
House of Hohenzollern
Margravines of Brandenburg-Bayreuth
Duchesses of Brunswick-Wolfenbüttel
Daughters of monarchs